Half Black Peak is a peak  northeast of Mount Edixon, rising to over  in the southeastern part of the Lanterman Range, in the Bowers Mountains of Victoria Land, Antarctica. The peak was descriptively named in 1983 by the New Zealand Antarctic Place-Names Committee on the proposal of M.G. Laird, because of the proximity of All Black Peak and from the color of this peak, half black rock and half snow. This topographical feature lies situated on the Pennell Coast, a portion of Antarctica lying between Cape Williams and Cape Adare.

References

Mountains of Victoria Land
Pennell Coast